Souls Highway is Beseech's third album, released in 2002 by Napalm Records. The CD features 11 tracks.

Track listing
 "Illusionate"
 "Between the Lines"
 "Souls Highway"
 "Blinded"
 "Endless Waters"
 "Fiction City"
 "Sunset 28"
 "A Last Farewell"
 "A Season in Green"
 "Beyond the Skies"
 "Gimme! Gimme! Gimme! (A Man After Midnight)"

References

2002 albums
Beseech albums
Napalm Records albums
Albums with cover art by Travis Smith (artist)